Venkataraman, Venkatraman and Venkitaraman are names of Indian origin, used both as family names and as masculine given names. People with those names include:

 Family name

K. Venkitaraman (born 1967), Indian, Accountant, Management Consultant
Aneesh Venkataraman (born 1978), American, Journalist, political speech writer
 Ashok Venkitaraman (born before 1998), British cancer researcher
 C. S. Venkataraman (191894), Indian mathematician
 G. S. Venkataraman (193098), Indian botanist and academic administrator
 Ganesh Venkatraman (active from 2008), Indian film actor
 Ganeshan Venkataraman (born 1932), Indian physicist, writer and academic administrator
 Janaki Venkataraman (19212010), First Lady of India 198792, wife of R. Venkataraman
Krishnasami Venkataraman (1901–81), Indian chemist
Padma Venkataraman (born 1942), Indian social activist, daughter of R. Venkataraman and Janaki Venkataraman
 Padma Venkatraman (AKA T. V. Padma, born 1969), Indian author of children's books
 R. Venkataraman (Ramaswamy Venkataraman, 19102009), Indian lawyer, independence activist and politician, President of India 198792
 R. Venkataraman (Indian cricketer), Indian cricketer (c.1934–2020)
 S. Venkataraman (1903–80), Indian politician
 S. V. Venkatraman (191198), Indian film actor, singer, and music director
 T. R. Venkataraman (active 1984), Indian politician
 Trivandrum R. Venkataraman (19382010), classical Indian musician and veena player, in the Carnatic tradition

 Given name
 V. Balakrishnan (physicist) (Venkataraman Balakrishnan, born 1943), Indian theoretical physicist
 Venkataraman Iyer (birth name of Ramana Maharshi, 18791950), Indian sage and jivanmukta
 V. Krishnamurthy (Venkataraman Krishnamurthy, active 196970), Indian civil servant
 V. Raghavan (Venkataraman Raghavan, 190879), Sanskrit scholar and musicologist
 Venkatraman Radhakrishnan (19292011), Indian space scientist
 Venkatraman Ramakrishnan (born 1952), Indian-born American and British structural biologist, awarded a share of the 2009 Nobel Prize in Chemistry
 S. Ve. Shekher (Sattanathapuram Venkataraman Shekher, born 1950), Tamil playwright and film actor
 Venkataraman Subramanya (born 1936), Indian international cricketer

See also 
 16215 Venkatraman, an asteroid; see List of minor planets: 16001–17000
 Baker–Venkataraman rearrangement, a chemical reaction discovered by and named after Wilson Baker and Krishnasami Venkataraman
 C. V. Raman (Chandrasekhara Venkata Raman, 18881970), Indian physicist who was awarded the 1930 Nobel Prize for Physics
 Venkata (disambiguation)
 
 
 

Surnames of Indian origin
Indian masculine given names